Elizabeth Wanyama (born 27 May 1987) is a Kenyan volleyball player. She is part of the Kenya women's national volleyball team. She participated at the 2010 FIVB Volleyball Women's World Championship, and at the 2015 FIVB Volleyball Women's World Cup.  

In 2021 Kenya's team for the postponed 2020 Summer Olympics was announced. Wanyama was not included in the dozen players chosen to travel to Japan.

Clubs
  Kenya Prisons

References

External links

 
 

 

1987 births
Living people
Kenyan women's volleyball players
People from Nyeri County